Florin Cotora (born 12 December 1972) is a Romanian former footballer who played as a goalkeeper. His brother, Lucian Cotora was also a footballer, they played together at Inter Sibiu. After he ended his playing career he worked as a DJ.

Honours
Apulum Alba Iulia
Divizia B: 2002–03

References

1972 births
Living people
Romanian footballers
Association football goalkeepers
Liga I players
Liga II players
FC Inter Sibiu players
CSM Unirea Alba Iulia players
Sportspeople from Sibiu